The Food Justice Movement is a grassroots initiative which emerged in response to food insecurity and economic pressures that prevent access to healthy, nutritious, and culturally appropriate foods (food should fit the cultural background of the people consuming it). It includes more broad policy movements, such as the Food and Agricultural Organization of the United Nations. 

Food justice recognizes the food system as "a racial project and problematizes the influence of race and class on the production, distribution and consumption of food". This encompasses farm labor work, land disputes, issues of status and class, environmental justice, public politics, and advocacy. Food justice is closely connected to food sovereignty, which critiques "structural barriers communities of color face to accessing local and organic foods" that are largely due to institutional racism and the effect it has on economic equality. It is argued that lack of access to good food is both a cause and a symptom of the structural inequalities that divide society. A possible solution presented for poor areas includes community gardens, fairness for food workers, and a national food policy.

History 
Food justice has been a part of the activist sphere since the founding of the United States. Yet, the history of our modern Food Justice Movement formulated in the early 1960s during the height of the Civil Rights Movement. Access to food for Black people was stripped, mounting pushback.

For example, in November 1962, the completely white board of supervisors in Leflore County voted to discontinue the Federal Surplus Food Commodity Program. Only white members of the community could attend, though those who used the program were less than 1 percent white. Officials like Mississippi's public welfare commissioner, Fred A. Ross, condemned the Student Nonviolent Coordinating Committee's free food distribution program. This welfare cut is now known as the Greenwood Food Blockade. The Federal Surplus Food Commodity Program provided items such as meal, flour, and powdered milk to 90 percent of Black people in the winters. In response to harsh conditions, the SNCC petitioned president John F. Kennedy to intervene. The federal government mandated that the program be continued, despite the continued pushback from white government officials. This marked the end of the Greenwood Food Blockade, but only was the beginning of white people in power weaponizing access to food.

Years later, the Black Panther Party played a big role in the burgeoning Food Justice movement in the coming years. In 1969, they launched the Free Breakfast for Children program at a church in Oakland, California. This model was adopted by countless cities across the country, and ultimately led Congress to increase funding for the National School Lunch Program and expand the breakfast program to all public schools.

A separate sphere of the Food Justice movement is that of the white community, whose trajectory in the movement differed from that of the Black activists. In 1996, the Community Food Security Coalition (CFSC) was an important player in advocating for access to fresh fruits and vegetables. However, this group was composed of all white Americans and neglected to seek input from residents of the food insecure areas they attempted to help. According to Daniel Ross, Director of Nuestras Raíces, food security cannot exist independently of the specific community in discussion because of how central food and agriculture are to a community.

Background 

The modern Food Justice movement grew out of the Community Food Security Coalition (CFSC) in 1996, which sought to provide affordable, culturally appropriate, healthy food to Americans. A shortcoming of this group was that it was composed entirely of white Americans, and accepted little input from residents of food insecure areas which the CFSC was trying to help. It emphasized the consumption of local and fresh fruits and vegetables, and removed race from the conversation. Director of Nuestras Raices Daniel Ross points out that:...food security cannot be divorced from the issues of concern to communities ... food and agriculture lends itself to addressing [racism and power imbalances] because food is so central to communities and, if you had working communities, you'd have justice and equality. ... At the heart is the element of justice.Other scholars who have done research in food justice and related topics include Monica M. White whose research is focused on the primarily black community in Detroit. In her article Sisters of the Soil: Urban Gardening as Resistance in Detroit, she discusses the work of the Detroit Black Community Food Security Network (DBCFSN) that uses farming as a way to alleviate food insecurity and make political statements. White cites the National Health and Nutrition Examination Survey of 2005–2006 to point out that 52.9% of black women are obese, compared to 37.2% of black men and 32.9% of white women due to phenomena like food deserts and food insecurity. Because the socioeconomic status of black communities in Detroit are a huge part of the food insecurity issues black communities face, this serves as an example for the inseparability of food justice movements and social reform.

Article 25 of the Universal Declaration of Human Rights states: "Everyone has the right to a standard of living adequate for the health and well being of himself and of his family, including food, clothing, housing and medical care and necessary social services, and the right to security in the event of unemployment, sickness, disability, widowhood, old age or other lack of livelihood in circumstances beyond his control."

The Food and Agricultural Organization of the United Nations states that the right to food is "The right to feed oneself in dignity. It is the right to have continuous access to the resources that will enable you to produce, earn or purchase enough food to not only prevent hunger, but also to ensure health and well-being. The right to food only rarely means that a person has the right to free handouts."

The United States Department of Agriculture (USDA) has the National Institute of Food and Agriculture (NIFA) which is a part of USDA's Research, Education, and Economics mission area (REE),  NIFA is an agency that uses federal funding in order to address agricultural and food justice related issues that impact people's daily lives. This is a collaborative effort that uses scientists and research in order to locate and find solutions to issues in the agricultural chain. They use science-policy decision making, something to keep in mind when asking what problems are being fixed and for what purpose.

Modern political response 
Food access and justice is a contentious topic in current day legislation.

The movement was highly popularized during President Obama's two terms, largely in part due to his wife, Michelle Obama. President Obama passed the Healthy, Hunger-Free Kids Act in 2010, calling for a raised nutrition standard in the National School Lunch Program. Despite some Republican lawmaker pushback, the law went into effect. In 2020, the University of Washington School of Public Health found that since the passing of this legislation, children from low-income households had been eating healthier school lunches with better nutritional quality.

Supplementing the legal action taken by the President, Michelle Obama's activism in the political sphere led to the onset of programs like Let's Move!, that targeted decreasing adolescent obesity across the United States. Nevertheless, a decade later, certain scholars justified a decrease in funding towards these programs that are anchored on obesity reduction instead of food justice and equity.

In 2017, the Food Deserts Act was introduced to the House. The Act called for consistent grants for grocery stores in areas defined as formal food deserts. Grant money would be allocated to selling healthy foods that are locally sourced. This bill did not make it past an introduction in the House. Scholars suggest that this highlights limited support for food justice from Congress, despite food insecurity being a relatively bipartisan issue.

In 2022, the Healthy Food Access for All Americans Act was introduced to the Senate. The legislation called for tax credits and grant funding for opening grocery stores and food banks in food deserts. The bill had yet to be passed .

Research and theory 
There is a plethora of research pertaining to community gardens, urban farming, and their impact on local communities. The literature tries to connect the activities of community gardens and urban agricultural projects to social, health, and economic outcomes. However, due to the overwhelming lack of diversity in the perspectives that inform the food justice movement, a new concept of just sustainability has been proposed. To address white and middle class culture dominating the discussion and priorities of organic food and sustainability practices, a more multi-cultural and intersectional approach is suggested that includes the narratives of historically marginalized communities.

Food movements and race 
The food justice movement points out that many food activists and scholars, such as journalist Michael Pollan, fail to account for the social and economic constraints that shape the food habits and choices of certain groups, and overly emphasize individual choices. Food justice activists point out that communities of color have lost food sovereignty, and they note that racism and economic inequality prevent Black communities in particular from having access to sufficient amounts of nutritious foods. This movement aims to reform the food system by addressing such structural inequalities and also by celebrating foods that are of cultural significance to different groups.

The intersection of race and food justice appears in the food justice movement, for example, in the San Francisco Bay Area and most notably in the city of Oakland. West Oakland, historically a neighborhood with a higher Black population, has also long been known as a food desert, meaning residents must travel over a mile for fresh food. Thirty five percent of residents in this area also lack access to a car to drive to a store, a quarter of residents live below the poverty line, and diabetes is three times more prevalent in this neighborhood than in the rest of Alameda County.

On a national level, Black households are twice as likely and Latinx households 1.5 more likely than white households to be food insecure. These disproportionate levels of food insecurity expose the systemic issues at the root of the problem. People are food insecure because they do not have room in their budget to buy sufficient food for themselves and their families, and the fact that people of color are more likely to be food insecure is because they are more likely to live in poverty. This goes back to societal issues of disinvestment in communities of color, with Black communities in particular being less likely to have access to quality education, job opportunities, and knowledge of government assistance programs. This issue was brought to public attention during COVID-19, when food insecurity levels dramatically increased, particularly for Black communities. One study in particular revealed that soon after the onset of COVID-19, food insecurity levels increased at a much quicker pace for a sample of low-income, primarily African American communities in comparison to the broader American population. The pandemic exposed which populations were most vulnerable; Black people are more likely to work in high exposure jobs, less likely to have access to quality health care, and more likely to face bias by health care workers. It is these inequalities that led to the food justice movement in the first place: a movement that specifically addresses racial disparities in the food system.

78% of Native Americans live outside of tribal-designated lands, despite literature on food security and Native peoples almost exclusively being in the context of reservation residency, and there is often a difference in food security seen in urban and rural settings among these individuals (Tomayko et al., 2017). A study done with 240 rural Native American households, and 210 urban Native American households found that the average rate of food insecurity was about 61%, with 80% of urban homes being food insecure and 45% of rural homes being food insecure within the study (Tomayko et al., 2017). Native Americans are often excluded from studies on food insecurity, and research on Native American food insecurity and injustices are rare. The USDA Annual Household Food Security Report in 2019 neglected to include Native American individuals in their findings (Meredith, 2020). One of the first and only longitudinal studies of Native food insecurity at the national level was written by Craig Gunderson in 2008, although the US government officially defined a measurement of food insecurity in 1995 (Gunderson, 2008).

Food justice and policy 

Food justice emerged as a way of applying food security and anti-hunger movements to policy by drawing from established social and environmental theoretical frameworks. The food justice movement is related to food sovereignty in that it critiques "structural barriers communities of color face to accessing local and organic foods" that are largely due to institutional racism and the effect it has on economic equality. This movement seeks to create equal access to nutritious food for all people, regardless of race, and policy is one mode that this mission is accomplished through. One way that this policy in integrated is through food policy councils, which have existed in North America since 1982. The implementation of food policy councils at the city level has allowed for changes to respond directly to community needs, with communities being involved with the creation of policy.

Organizations and festivals such as the Coalition of Immokalee Workers, Familias Unidas por la Justicia, and Farm Aid are credited as working to raise awareness of or assist with food justice by fighting for family farmers to keep and sustain their land, fair pay and treatment of workers, and ensuring access to healthy foods to those previously denied affordable nourishment.

Consequences

Food deserts 
Food deserts are defined by the USDA as census tracts that contain a notable population of low income people that lack access to healthy and affordable food, such as a typical chain grocery store within reachable distance. In food deserts, it is typical to see an abundance of fast food restaurants alongside gas stations and liquor stores with no fresh food, only offering bagged chips, sodas, and other quick eat items that lack nutritional substance, are available, alongside fast food restaurants that do not offer healthy options. In a Report to Congress done by the United States Department of Agriculture, it was found that 23.5 million Americans live more than one mile away from a grocery store and do not have access to a car. There are concerns regarding individuals in food insecure areas that have to rely on public transportation to access local food markets to grocery stores.

Some activists criticize the term "food desert" as a bad descriptor of these neighborhoods, for two main reasons. First, the word "desert" implies something that is naturally existing. Deserts are labeled as so because they receive a certain amount of precipitation, a factor beyond human control. Rather, urban planner Karen Washington of Johns Hopkins explains that residents in "food deserts" often may have food, but it is the quality of such food that suffers. Grocery stores may have produce that is financially inaccessible for residents, and as such proximity is not always the main issue. Research from the University of Washington has shown that proximity to supermarkets had no correlation to ability to shop at a supermarket, and perhaps social deprivation is a better explanation. Scholars have used the term food mirage to explain this concept.

Food apartheid 
In recent years, racial justice organizers began to label the lack of access to fresh, healthy, and affordable food a form of Food Apartheid. These organizers argue that this disparity is predominantly because of structural inequalities that deprive poor communities of color from access to the same selections of food as richer white communities. Ashante Reese, author of Black Food Geographies: Race, Self-Reliance, and Food Access explains that the anti-Black  racism and uneven capitalist urban development create conditions that can only be called food apartheid.

Critics of this term explain that using the word apartheid to describe this unequal food access devalues the suffering inflicted on millions of South Africans upon its introduction in 1948. Apartheid was a traumatic experience for the millions of South Africans that lived under apartheid rule, and for that reason some call it an insensitive label for the food segregation phenomenon.

Structural inequities 
Access to food is a highly racialized topic.

Indigenous Americans 
Most of the farms in the United States exist on stolen land from legislation such as the Indian Removal Act of 1830. This land was then portioned among white settlers for extremely low costs, through legislation such as the Homestead Act. Prior to European colonization of the Americas, the indigenous people that inhabited America had various regionally unique food resources.

In 2020, it was reported that one in four Native Americans lacked reliable access to healthy food and had a much higher risk for diet-related diseases. American Indian and Alaska Native adults were 50% more likely to be obese and 30% more likely to suffer from hypertension compared to White Americans. They are also 50% more likely to be diagnosed with coronary heart disease, and three times more likely to have diabetes.

Valarie Blue Bird Jernigan, the executive director of the Center for Indigenous Health Research and Policy, posited that these levels of food insecurity were a direct result of colonization. Her Community-based Participatory Research (CBPR) study on the Round Valley Reservation in Mendocino County, California, found that the 4,000 residents studied had nutritionally poor diets because of lack of access to fresh foods. The Round Valley Reservation's only sources of food during the study was a single grocery store located in the town over, with a fried chicken fast food restaurant inside, where 85% of its shelf space was dedicated to prepackaged foods. The only other source was reported to be a gas station which sold prepackaged snacks and hot dogs.

Currently, up to 85% of Native American peoples on Reservations take part in food assistance programs, one of them being the US Department of Agriculture's (USDA's) Food Distribution Program on Indian Reservations (FDPIR). The foods that these programs distribute are often canned and prepackaged, inevitably being high in salt, sugar, and fats as well as low in vital micronutrients. Jernigan commented that reform would be necessary to target unequal health outcomes for Native Americans, explaining that her ideal solution was increased efforts to focus on providing Indigenous food sovereignty, a specific policy approach that would work to mobilize communities using multi-millennial cultural harvesting strategies.

Black Americans 

Black Americans also experience unequal access to healthy food. In the aftermath of slavery, many Black men became landowners, but between 1865 and 1910, some of this land was stolen from them through underhanded legal practices and violent acts. Many were also left unable to own any land, resulting in Black people being forced to sharecrop on other people's land. White supremacist violence and discriminatory money lending policies, many of which were instituted by the US Department of Agriculture, allowed for White developers to easily acquire properties. In 1920, Black Americans owned 14% of American farms. In 2017, that proportion had gone down to 2%.

The inability to farm and grow one's own food on one's own land precented many communities from achieving a sustainable food system with equal access to good nutrition. The executive director of the National Black Food and Justice Alliance, Dara Cooper, stated that for food justice to be achieved within many Black communities, these communities would require the ownership and control of the businesses and institutions that deliver said food.

Beyond farming discrimination, since the end of the Great Recession, the income disparity between Black and White households widened. The intersection of socioeconomic inequality and the racial history of how Black Americans have been allowed to control the production of food creates a higher risk for Black Americans to face food insecurity. Food mirages explain the concept of grocery stores being present, but healthy items within them being financially out of reach for their customers.

Harlem, New York is a neighborhood that highlights much of the radicalized nature of food injustice. Harlem was 87.6% Black in 1990. Past and current resident Angela Helm explains that at the time, the neighborhood would have been described as a food desert. Spurred by a real estate transformation, Starbucks locations began to open and President Bill Clinton moved his office into the neighborhood. As such, rents began to skyrocket and the landscape shifted. Residents protested the opening of Whole Foods, which drew in White neighbors and produce that remained unaffordable for residents and their families. Gentrification is a phenomenon that disproportionately impacts Black residents in urban areas, and also their access to food.

A similar phenomenon can be seen in New Orleans, Louisiana. Following the destruction wreaked by Hurricane Katrina, New Orleans East was still home to 73,000 predominantly African American residents. This neighborhood in itself would constitute the fourth-largest city in Louisiana, yet the entire neighborhood has not a single grocery store.

To target these disparities in economic capital, Soul Fire Farm, an Afro-Indigenous centered community farm, created a reparations map to allow these efforts to become more useful. Additionally, other scholars propose nutrition incentive programs, that provide cash matches for SNAP and WIC benefits spent on fruits and vegetables in markets and grocery stores.

Residential segregation 

Food apartheid and the lack of access to food are the results of racist politicking and they stem from socioeconomic injustices that disproportionately affect low income Black communities. According to the ACLU, food deserts are the direct manifestation of structural inequities that have been solidified over time. These institutional racisms that have resulted in a lack of access to healthy food for minorities are innumerable—but among them include housing policies leading to segregated communities and financial policies leading to commercial flight. These policies have all interacted over time to contribute to health disparities among the Black community.

In 1962, 61% of White Americans shared the sentiment that "white people [possessed] a right to keep blacks out of their neighborhoods if they [wanted] to, and blacks should respect that right." Despite years of policy changes a result of the Civil Rights Movement, 30 years later in 1990, a Detroit survey of whites found that a quarter of white respondents would not move into a neighborhood that was more than 50% Black. Discrimination towards Blacks continues to influence real estate practices, while public policies and institutional discrimination continue to reinforce race segregated living patterns. Although segregation by race is illegal, it has not ceased to be the standard in America. Living patterns are not only correlated with access to educational opportunities, and employment opportunities—they are also correlated to access to food.

Studies published by the American Journal of Preventive Medicine have found that low-income neighborhoods and minority neighborhoods are less likely to have access to large supermarkets. Federal government policies have directly hindered the development of supermarkets in Black populated communities. As middle-income whites got subsidized government loans to move from cities to suburbia, businesses, including supermarkets, relocated with them. Grocery stores and retailers alike, were supported by the United States government to relocate to the suburbs—catering to the White middle class and leaving the cities desolate.

Another housing issue related to food justice is the phenomena of green gentrification. Green gentrification is the idea that as initiatives to promote nutritious food in communities such as community gardens and farmers markets grow, neighborhoods become more appealing, and attract wealthier residents. These resources which were originally implemented to benefit low-income and marginalized communities then end up being used by more privileged populations. This was seen in Oakland, California, when a community garden started by the food justice organization Phat Beets was shown in a real estate ad. Issues such as this one have led to many food justice organizations incorporating other social justice issues such as gentrification and affordable housing into their missions.

Health outcomes related to nutrition in communities of color 
Research links many health issues to the lack of nutritious food, and since food insecurity disproportionately impacts people of color, so do these health conditions. For example, cancer, diabetes, and other nutrition-related health conditions are disproportionately seen in communities of color. According to the Centers For Disease Control, obesity has been linked to a wide range of health problems including Type 2 Diabetes, cardiovascular diseases, various types of cancer, hypertension, and high cholesterol among both adults and children.

In a 2004 study done by medical doctors and public health professionals of New York's Icahn School of Medicine at Mount Sinai, a community coalition study was done to compare the availability and cost of diabetes-healthy foods in a Black populated neighborhood in East Harlem with that of the adjacent White, wealthy Upper East Side in New York City. Researchers surveyed 173 East Harlem and 152 Upper East Side grocery stores to find whether or not they stocked five basic diabetes-diet recommended foods. Results showed that only 18% of East Harlem stores stocked the recommended foods, compared with 58% of stores in the Upper East Side. Further, they found that only 9% of East Harlem bodegas (convenience stores) carried all five recommended items while 48% of Upper East Side bodegas carried the items. This discrepancy is an example of how structural inequalities such as lack of access to healthy foods perpetuate high levels of type 2 diabetes in the black community.

Victim blaming 
Access to food disproportionately affects minority communities, but victim-blaming narratives about them exist. For example, an article published by the U.S. Department of Agriculture, Economic Research Service entitled "Access to Affordable, Nutritious Food is Limited in Food Deserts", states that consumers' demographic and economic characteristics, buying habits, and tastes can explain why stores do not locate in some areas or carry particularly healthy foods. Some criticized that such argument blames the communities themselves for the lack of access to healthy food and fails to acknowledge the historical influences and governmental policies that have marginalized these minority communities. Additionally, one study found that the difference in nutritional quality of food between food secure and food insecure populations was likely to be a result of financial or time constraints. Finally, food insecure minority communities were found to be less likely to have the cooking facilities or skills needed to cook home cooked meals.

Food sovereignty 
Food sovereignty is defined in the Declaration of Nyéléni as "the right of peoples to healthy and culturally appropriate food produced through ecologically sound and sustainable methods, and their right to define their own food and agriculture systems." It revolves around the issues of "self determination, global uneven development, and ecological degradation," issues commonly associated with the Global South and rural Global North. This differs from food justice, which mostly describes inaccessibility and consumption of healthy food. Other common areas of food sovereignty discourse include issues of scarcity, environmental factors, population growth, and allocation of resources. Food sovereignty often places emphasis on property rights of indigenous communities and small-scale farmers.

The food sovereignty movement in the United States was inspired by the Belgium-based international La Via Campesina movement, and focuses on the right to produce food. This movement challenges current neoliberal approaches to solving food insecurity, and introduces a radical restructuring of the food system. Food sovereignty takes a more rights-based approach than other forms of food movements, where every individual has the right to culturally appropriate, sustainably produced food.

Food sovereignty and the Global South 
Colonialism is also a major source of food insecurity in the Global South. Colonialism had a direct impact on those who depended on seasonal farming due to prolonged droughts in certain regions, however, colonial policy often made important pasture and water resources legally inaccessible. Food insecurity has been perpetuated by post-colonial policies more recently through the inflation of food prices, aggregation of cropland, and displacement of groups from land available for food crops. Similarly, colonial policies that encouraged the planting of cash crops for export over subsistence crops has continued to affect food security in the Global South. Many Global South countries have subsequently become dependent on food aid from Global North nations.

Food sovereignty and the United States 
Food sovereignty is also an important part of the food justice movement in Global North countries, such as the United States. In the United States, food sovereignty is a critical part of indigenous food activism. Indigenous food sovereignty activists argue that indigenous communities have been systematically displaced from their traditional foodways, which has led to mass food insecurity. They assert that the most effective way to achieve food security for indigenous groups is for those groups to be more involved in the production of their own food. Some activists also argue for food sovereignty as a means of healing historical trauma. Food sovereignty of indigenous groups is also closely linked to seed sovereignty and plant breeders' rights. This is because seed saving is an important practice both culturally and for the preservation of a large enough seed stock to feed communities.

High rates of food insecurity among Native peoples is juxtaposed by the reality that current American cuisine is largely dependent on Native American food culture, with the influences of potatoes, beans, corn, peanuts, pumpkins, tomatoes, squash, peppers, melons, and sunflower seeds. The indigenous food sovereignty movement has climbed to the forefront in combating food insecurity among Native peoples to incorporate back these traditional foods in their communities. With this is the increasing support for Tribal governance on Native lands to hopefully increase accessibility to these traditional foods, increase the support of home food production, and educate on the traditions of gathering, preparation, and preservation of food.

Food Justice Interventions

Urban or community farms 
One of the first tactics to battle the food injustice and scarcity found in both rural and urban areas is by the use of community or urban gardens. Community gardens, according to the American Community Gardening Association's (ACGA) mission statement, are essential catalysts for the neighborhood and surrounding community by not only helping combat food insecurity in providing healthy food options but it is also economically and environmentally sound, these gardens also provide a source for recreation, therapy, beauty and education. 

In addition, having communal gardens may also benefit immigrants and refugees who use gardening as a tactic to immerse themselves in new surroundings while also getting a chance to reconnect with their culture and receive food for their family and community. This epitomizes how the Center for Rural Affairs sees the working of the community food system of which may take many forms but at its core aims to, form a connection between the producers locals who grow or make the food and the consumers, the community. Despite the great change and development community gardens bring, many in these communities had to fight for the right to use the land for gardening which was evident in the 1960s with "guerrilla gardening" tactics to combat land scarcity and resist the, "inequalities between the powerful and powerless." Today, according to the ACGA annual report, 61% of community or urban gardens are found on government lands, indicating the important role local governments play in the allowing or blocking the use of community gardens through the implementation of opposing legislation or strict land use policies.

Produce availability 
Equity in both the decision-making process and the distribution of resources is the core of the food justice movement and can be achieved through government policies. One possible course of action to combat food deserts may be in mandating that corner stores and such in food deserts provide some variation of fruits and vegetables. For instance, in Minneapolis, the Department of Health and Family Support understood, that residents in food deserts, who were unable to travel to grocery stores or farmers markets, purchased their staple foods from convenience stores, which also carried more unhealthy quick foods rather than fresh produce. To combat this issue the Minneapolis City Council passed an ordinance requiring Minneapolis corner stores to carry "five varieties of perishable produce" and the Minnesota Department of Health requires, "WIC-certified stores to carry a minimum of seven varieties (and thirty pounds) of fresh produce." However even with the ordinances North Minneapolis residents who, "shopped most often at corner stores... did not purchase produce from them," due to factors such as produce being out of site or not fresh. This indicates however that ordinances as such may not always be enough. In the case of Minneapolis, the MDHFS created the Healthy Corner Store Program to ensure the success of the ordinance by providing assistance from a grocery store consultant to store owners to, "making healthy foods and fresh produce more visible, affordable, and attractive to neighborhood residents."

Another possible solution to food injustices and specifically food injustice may be in making new regulations providing that there be more grocery stores in urban and rural areas. The USDA also sees this as an issue in stating that 2.2 million Americans have difficulty in accessing large grocery stores due to have to travel over a mile in urban areas or more than 10 in urban areas may increase reliance on convenience stores and restaurants(fast food), resulting in a poor diet and diet-related health problems. The USDA recognizes that the limited food access in Urban core areas, "are characterized by higher levels of racial segregation and greater income inequality." In small-town and rural areas with limited the lack of transportation infrastructure."
However not all chain groceries will go into small neighborhoods due to the risk and upkeep, For places like West Oakland in California, where about half the residents do not have a car, access to grocery stores is even more so a struggle, so Brahm Ahmadi, decided to open his own full service grocery store and health center by selling bonds directly to the public.

Food vending 
Food trucks and other local services provide another option to help provide food to food deserts and other rural areas. In some places these food trucks like the Second Harvest Food Bank's Produce Mobile Program help communities and neighborhoods in need by providing them with high-quality and fresh produce. Food trucks are another important source of food, and are unique in their mobility but also in their locations. Food trucks are found in cities, towns, and universities all over the United States and Canada although they have a longer history in places like Portland where there was little laws preventing them or Los Angeles where immigrants carried on traditions. Other spaces for these vendors became fairly recent in places like Montreal where trucks and cultural spaces were previously regulated. Although often overlooked because they may not always supply the most 'healthy' food, they help combat food insecurity by supplying food to communities that either have no other means of getting food or simply bringing more food options into the community. 

Food trucks have also been labeled, "powerful affirmation of pop-up urbanism," that are controlled by ordinary people creating culturally different and creative spaces. However, food trucks and other street vendors have often been banned by cities if they did not have permits or if they were considered a competitive threat to establishments nearby. Yet recently, legislation in California (SB946) and Arizona (HB 2371) are aimed to not only legalize food trucks statewide but also decriminalize the sidewalk vending. Legislation like these will not only help to boost the local economy but it will also allow vendors to safely and securely provide food to the community. However food trucks are not just an American or Western phenomenon, they are part of a phenomenon that has been quite common in much of the Global South. Food vending in the Global South slightly differs as food vending enables many to simply survive, hang on, and cope with urban towns. It also allows them to develop networks and strategies to get by in these towns by forming relationships with commercial and small-holder irrigation farmers. Food delivery services are another way from either local grocery stores or market boxes sent to your door. However, some of these tend to be expensive or require internet accessibility to control your account, depending on the community especially those in rural areas this option may not be possible.

There are other innovations from the nonprofit, social enterprise sector that show promise for connecting residents with limited access to fresh food to sources of fresh produce. New Roots Fresh Stop Markets were created in 2009 with the express purpose of "igniting community power for fresh food access." Fresh Stop Markets are fresh food markets that pop up biweekly in urban fresh food insecure communities in Louisville, Kentucky, southern Indiana, and in two rural Kentucky towns—Hazard and Brandenburg. Families agree to cooperate with each other and pool their resources—SNAP Benefits and Debit/Credit—on an income-based sliding scale, a week ahead, purchasing in bulk from local, organic farmers. This big buying power creates an opportunity for farmers to sell to a committed group with no risk, while families benefit from wholesale prices. Each family receives the same share (bag) of fresh, seasonal produce regardless of what they pay. Fresh Stop Markets always feature a chef or culinary enthusiast who demos fresh, plant-based dishes, distributes recipes and shares information and support. Veggie cheerleaders advocate for the vegetables so that everyone feels comfortable with the varieties offered. Fresh Stop Markets are volunteer driven by shareholders so that everyone from children to older adults can offer to share their knowledge with others.

SNAP and other food assistance programs 

Another solution to potentially combat the food injustice, both in terms of quality and quantity of food, is in government provided subsidies and vouchers to help alleviate financial burden in affording food, as well as making healthier options available. The U.S. Federal government, as many other governments has put in much of its resources, approximately 50 billion dollars per year towards nutrition assistance programs. Snap is one of these programs, mitigated by the federal government under the Food and Nutrition Service (FNS) in the 1960s that according to one of their publications, "improves health, enhances self-sufficiency, and alleviates food insecurity." The Public Policy Institute has conducted research showing that since the introduction of food stamps, they have reduced illnesses attributed to poor diet such as diabetes and increased average birth weights among adults who had access to the program from youth. 

Food vouchers such as Calfresh had success in reducing "food insecurity among low-income households" during the recent recession. However, despite the efforts made by these comprehensive assistance networks the United States has failed to make little to no advancement towards reducing food insecurity to 6% , relative to 1995 when measurements of food inequity within households began.
With prevalent ideas/facts like these as well as the fear of fraudulent cases the federal government has proposed a new way to alleviate food insecurity and provide what it deems as healthier choices in the Food Harvest Program. The harvest program cut the budget for SNAP by 30% over the next ten years by using a food delivery service to provide a box of non-perishable "surplus" goods to the recipients including a set box with canned fruits, vegetables, meats, peanut butter, and canned or frozen meat, and shelf stable milk, each box will be sized to the family size and granted benefits. However other sources note that those with more than $90 a month in benefits, additional to the box  will have any remaining balance put on to their EBT cards. There is a lack of choice in terms of what food the participants can have. Even though many still purchase foods that are deemed unhealthy much of this is due to the fact that some may live in substandard housing or not have a functional kitchen so these foods, although some may be healthy  will not always be suitable for all recipients. In comparison to SNAP, the administration's new program would only cover 90,000 people, while the former helped millions to come out of poverty. There are still many questions left to answer, like delivery and how recipients will receive their boxes, as the use of delivery may pose a risk for delays.

Beyond money there are children and summer food programs enacted in various states including California that allows either free or reduced lunches for those in food deserts and underprivileged neighborhoods. These initiatives allow these individuals to have food security in having necessary access to food they would not be able to have otherwise. Being that schools are pivotal institutions in securing food availability, the USDA has, done its part in having healthy/wholesome options available by adding new items to school lunches such as frozen rather than canned mixed berries and vegetables, grilled chicken breast fillets, egg patty rounds, and white whole wheat flour.

Education 

Many argue that simply increasing availability and providing vouchers will not solve the food justice issue in regards to food deserts, which is where the argument for nutrition education comes in. Studies have been shown that eating habits do not change when put grocery stores in poor neighborhoods, as reiterated by Barry Popkin, a professor of Nutrition at the University of North Carolina stated that simply adding a grocery store in poor neighborhoods, will not make a huge impact as food prices and people's shopping and eating habits undermine convenience. 

According to a study, within the first year government-subsidized supermarkets in high need neighborhoods households were reported to have a significance effect on food availability and consumption habits. Reasoning behind this includes that individuals formed reliance on their usual supermarkets and the abundance and affordability of processed foods. Due to these reasons, overall lower income families bought less healthy food than wealthier families, however there were even greater disparities found, "between families with and without a college education." These results suggest that in order to improve a person's diet and change perceptions it is essential that there be education on diet and health on top of increasing food accessibility and affordability. However the affordability of food may in fact influence food choice if the government chose to not only subsidize fruits and vegetables but also tax fast food, "to improve weight outcomes among children and adolescents."

Genetically Engineered Crops 

While many food justice interventions function at more localized scales, food injustice is both systemic and complex, and touches on the uneven global allocation of finite resources. The global food scarcity ideology is at the heart of many corporate food justice campaigns, and entities including Bayer campaign on feeding the world - and therefore cultivating more just societies - by using genetic engineering crops. Reports have questioned both the efficacy and ethics of GE crops as food justice strategies. These interventions also pose risks that threaten other pillars of just and ecologically viable societies; critics of GMOs cite the harms of overproduction, as well as decreasing genetic diversity of crops which can lead to wipe out due to invasive species.

Criticisms 
Working locally allows organizations to directly solve issues of hunger in their immediate communities, and this work is often successful in providing more nutritious food to disadvantaged communities. However, critics of the food justice movement argue that working locally also prevents larger structural changes from occurring. Most organizations work around the neoliberal food system in place, and mitigate damage done by this system instead of taking down the system itself. NGOs are an important part of the food movement, yet these NGOs require outside funding which some argue depoliticizes the movement. 

To remain strong in their values and their mission, some in the movement argue that no connections can exist between their organizations and outside companies that do not align with their goals. However, these organizations need money to have a strong impact, and face the challenge of finding a balance between radicalism and realistic change. Similarly, there is concern that the food justice movement will end up becoming an "empty signifier" on food labels as a means of greenwashing and false advertising- a concern that becomes more real when organizations are forced to turn to outside companies. Food justice has a longer history in the US than other movements such as food sovereignty, and was initially seen as politically strong with its roots in groups including the Black Panthers. However, more recently, critics argue that food sovereignty is leading to more effective restructuring of the unequal food system.

See also 

 Food Security
 Sustainable agriculture
 Slow Food 
 Fair Trade
 Fair Food Program
 Agroecology
 Right to food

References 

Sustainable agriculture
Sustainability
Sustainable food system
Justice